The North Country Baseball League (NCBL) was an independent, professional baseball league located in the Northeastern region of the United States in 2015. Operating in cities not served by Major League Baseball or their minor-league affiliates, the NCBL had four franchise teams spread throughout the states of New York and Maine.

The league was originally proposed as the East Coast Baseball League and had six teams, four in the United States and two in Ontario, Canada. Right before the season started, the Watertown team pulled out over what they claimed were unfulfilled promised by the ECBL management. The other U.S.-based teams also pulled out and with Watertown formed the NCBL; the two Canadian teams then folded.

The NCBL had an unofficial affiliation with the Atlantic League of Professional Baseball, and several NCBL players were called up to the Atlantic League. The Newburgh Newts won the initial league championship series.

Three of the four teams that took part in the NCBL's lone season moved to the Empire Professional Baseball League for 2016.

Teams

(*) Originally started as the Newburgh Newts, based at Delano-Hitch Stadium in Newburgh, New York, but the team left after three weeks due to lack of sponsorship or fan interest (brought on by poor scheduling). When league ownership had been informed that the check for the first months rent (paid by the ECBL) had in fact bounced, they choose to leave Newburgh.

(**) Operations based in Watertown, New York. The Explorers were in negotiations to play a limited home stand at Point Stadium in Johnstown, Pennsylvania, but the collapse of the ECBL halted the negotiations between the two. Moved to Rome, New York for 2016 season.

Originally proposed ECBL teams

References

External links
Official Website

2015 establishments in the United States
2015 disestablishments in the United States
Defunct independent baseball leagues in the United States
Baseball in Ontario
Baseball leagues in Maine
Baseball leagues in New York (state)